This is an index of equipment used by naval forces of Iran:
 List of equipment of the Navy of the Islamic Revolutionary Guard Corps
 List of current ships of the Islamic Republic of Iran Navy
lists above mention currently commissioned vessels.
 List of former Iranian naval vessels
 List of Imperial Iranian Navy vessels active in 1979
 Afsharid navy#Equipment
lists above mentions historical naval ships.
 List of naval ship classes of Iran
list above mentions previous, current and future ship classes 

Lists of ships of Iran
Iranian military-related lists